Myersiohyla is a genus of frogs in the family Hylidae. It was erected in 2005 following a major revision of the Hylidae and initially included four species that were previously placed in the genus Hyla. The genus is found in the tepui region of Guyana and Venezuela.

Species
There are six species in this genus:
 Myersiohyla aromatica (Ayarzagüena and Señaris, 1994)
 Myersiohyla chamaeleo (Faivovich, McDiarmid, and Myers, 2013)
 Myersiohyla inparquesi (Ayarzagüena and Señaris, 1994)
 Myersiohyla liliae (Kok, 2006)
 Myersiohyla loveridgei (Rivero, 1961)
 Myersiohyla neblinaria (Faivovich, McDiarmid, and Myers, 2013)

References

Further reading
 Faivovich, McDiarmid, Myers: Two new species of Myersiohyla (Anura, Hylidae) from Cerro de la Neblina, Venezuela, with comments on other species of the genus. (American Museum Novitates, no. 3792)

 
Cophomantinae
Amphibian genera
Amphibians of South America
Taxa named by Jonathan A. Campbell
Taxa named by Darrel Frost
Amphibians of the Tepuis